Greenland (Surrey Quays) Pier is a pier on the River Thames in London, United Kingdom.

Services
Greenland (Surrey Quays) Pier is a stop on the Thames commuter catamaran service run by Thames Clippers from Embankment Pier, via Tower Millennium Pier, Canary Wharf Pier and on to Greenwich Pier, the North Greenwich Pier, Royal Wharf Pier, Woolwich (Royal Arsenal) Pier and Barking Riverside Pier.

Ownership
Threats of closure due to maintenance issues have been a recurrent problem in recent years.  Despite a pledge to revamp the pier for the London 2012 Olympics, Southwark Council was unable to secure the investment required and served notice of the pier's closure on 16 March 2012.  Subsequent negotiations between Thames Clippers and Southwark Council resulted in its purchase by Thames Clippers, who will now take responsibility for its upkeep.

Lines

References

London River Services
Transport in the London Borough of Southwark
Piers in London